The 1960 United States elections was held on November 8, and elected the members of the 87th United States Congress. The  Democratic Party retained control of Congress and won the presidency. 

In the presidential election, Democratic Senator John F. Kennedy from Massachusetts defeated sitting Republican Vice President Richard Nixon. Kennedy carried a mix of Southern, Midwestern, and Northeastern states, while Nixon dominated the West and won a majority of states. Fourteen unpledged electors from Alabama and Mississippi voted for Democratic Senator Harry F. Byrd from Virginia, as many Southern Democrats opposed the national party's stance on civil rights. Kennedy's popular vote margin of victory was the closest in any presidential election in the 20th century, with Kennedy garnering 0.17% more of the popular vote than his opponent. Nixon, the first sitting vice president to win either party's nomination since John C. Breckinridge in 1860, easily won his party's nomination. Sitting Republican President Dwight D. Eisenhower was the first president in American history to be legally ineligible for re-election, due to the 1951 ratification of the 22nd Amendment. Kennedy won the Democratic nomination on the first ballot, defeating Texas Senator Lyndon B. Johnson. Kennedy's general election victory made him the first Catholic president.

This was the second consecutive presidential election where the winning candidate did not have coattails in either house of Congress.

See also
1960 United States presidential election
1960 United States House of Representatives elections
1960 United States Senate elections
1960 United States gubernatorial elections

References

 
1960